The 2020–21 Sydney Sixers Women's season was the sixth in the team's history. Coached by Ben Sawyer and captained by Ellyse Perry, the Sixers played the entirety of WBBL06 in a bio-secure Sydney hub due to the COVID-19 pandemic. They finished the regular season in fifth place on the points table, directly below the Perth Scorchers due to an inferior net run rate. Consequently, the Sixers narrowly missed out on qualifying for the finals for the second-straight year.

Squad 
Each 2020–21 squad was made up of 15 active players. Teams could sign up to five 'marquee players', with a maximum of three of those from overseas. Marquees are classed as any overseas player, or a local player who holds a Cricket Australia national contract at the start of the WBBL|06 signing period.

Personnel changes made ahead of the season included:

 Lauren Smith departed the Sixers, signing with the Sydney Thunder.
 Angela Reakes returned to the Sixers, where she played the first three WBBL seasons before a two-year stint with the Melbourne Stars.
 Lisa Griffith signed with the Sixers, departing the Sydney Thunder.

The table below lists the Sixers players and their key stats (including runs scored, batting strike rate, wickets taken, economy rate, catches and stumpings) for the season.

Ladder

Fixtures 

All times are local time

In front of a sold out reduced-capacity home crowd, the Sydney Sixers put on a 104-run opening partnership which came to an end during the 13th over when Alyssa Healy was stumped by Josie Dooley off the bowling of Molly Strano for 63. Two balls later, Ellyse Perry was dismissed for 37 by a spectacular diving catch from Courtney Webb, lauded as a contender for the best of the season. Marizanne Kapp (22 not out from 17 balls) and Erin Burns (19 off 11) helped the Sixers finish their innings with a total of 4/166.

On the first ball of the run chase, Lizelle Lee was dropped at backward point off the bowling of Perry. At just 3/70 in the 11th over, Webb joined Lee in the middle for the Melbourne Renegades to form a rapid 73-run stand from 33 deliveries. Sixers veteran Sarah Aley eventually broke through in the 16th over, removing Lee for 79 via a Burns catch in the outfield. Requiring 24 runs from the remaining 26 balls, Webb (46 not out off 28) saw the Renegades across the line with six wickets in hand inside the last over, mirroring her finishing heroics of a similarly tight encounter between the two teams in WBBL05. The loss dramatically decreased the Sixers' chances of qualifying for finals heading into the final day of the regular season.

The match was also shrouded in controversy, and the outcome potentially affected, due to an "administration error" self-reported by the Sixers before the commencement of the second innings. Hayley Silver-Holmes, who had missed several previous games due to injury, was named in the team line-up despite not having yet been granted approval by the W/BBL Technical Committee to be added back into the official squad. Upon discovering the mistake, the Sixers ensured Silver-Holmes took no active part in the game and Maddy Darke replaced her as a substitute fielder, leaving them a bowler short in what was essentially a must-win game. Cricket Australia (CA) fined the Sixers $25,000 ($15,000 suspended for twelve months) with CA's Head of Integrity and Security stating that the breach, "while serious in nature," had a "reduced impact due to the Club's actions" during the game.

Statistics and awards 
 Most runs: Alyssa Healy – 402 (5th in the league)
Highest score in an innings: Alyssa Healy – 111 (52) vs Melbourne Stars, 22 November
Most wickets: Marizanne Kapp – 13 (equal 12th in the league)
Best bowling figures in an innings: Marizanne Kapp – 3/14 (2 overs) vs Adelaide Strikers, 26 October
Most catches: Erin Burns – 9 (2nd in the league)
Player of the Match awards:
Alyssa Healy – 3
Erin Burns, Ashleigh Gardner, Ellyse Perry – 1 each
WBBL06 Player of the Tournament: Alyssa Healy (equal 4th)
Sixers Most Valuable Player: Alyssa Healy

References 

2020–21 Women's Big Bash League season by team
Sydney Sixers (WBBL)